The Second Step: Chapter One is the first extended play (EP) by South Korean boy band Treasure. The EP was released by YG Entertainment on February 15, 2022. The EP is also the last album to feature Yedam and Mashiho as they left the group in November 2022.

Background 
On January 11, 2022, YG Entertainment released the teaser video announcing comeback date to be February 15. On February 24, the band received their first-ever music show win through the cable network program, Show Champion, and the single "Jikjin". Their first Japanese extended play, entitled with the same name was released on March 23, 2022.

Commercial performance 
On January 20, 2022, it was reported that the EP had reached 600,000 pre-order sales. The music video of its titular, "Jikjin" (직진), acquired a ₩500 million ($420,000) investment by the band's label and accumulated 10 and 20 million views in 21 hours and under three days respectively on the platform, YouTube, both personal records. Its view count rose by five times, faster than its previous releases. The first installation recorded a sales figure of 700,000 copies in three days time upon its release, also a personal best.

Darari, the other song of the EP went viral on TikTok with over 5 million videos used on the platform. It also peaked at position 97 on Spotify Global Charts.

Track listing

Accolades

Charts

Weekly charts

Monthly charts

Year-end charts

Release history

References 

2022 debut EPs
Treasure (band) EPs
Korean-language EPs
YG Entertainment EPs